Claudio Alberto Verino (born January 31, 1984, in Rosario) is an Argentine footballer who plays as a centre-back for Sportivo Belgrano of the Torneo Argentino A in Argentina.

External links
 BDFA profile 
  
 

1984 births
Living people
Argentine footballers
Footballers from Rosario, Santa Fe
Veikkausliiga players
Primera B Metropolitana players
Primera Nacional players
Torneo Federal A players
San Lorenzo de Almagro footballers
Club Atlético San Miguel footballers
Unión de Santa Fe footballers
CSyD Tristán Suárez footballers
Club Atlético Atlanta footballers
FC Inter Turku players
Club Atlético Colegiales (Argentina) players
Club Atlético Douglas Haig players
Sportivo Belgrano footballers
Sarmiento de Resistencia footballers
Chaco For Ever footballers
Expatriate footballers in Finland
Argentine expatriate sportspeople in Finland
Argentine expatriate footballers
Association football fullbacks